Elections to Sheffield Council were held on 11 May 1967. The entire council was up for election, following changes to the city borders, which extended into parts of Derbyshire, and extensive boundary changes and reorganisation of the wards. The wards Cathedral, Crookesmoor, Moor, Norton, Tinsley and Woodseats were abolished, with the new wards of Beauchief, Castle, Dore, Gleadless, Intake and Netherthorpe created. These, along with the inclusion of the Birley and Mosborough wards from neighbouring areas, brought the councillor total to 81 - up six from previous.

The election itself seen a historic night for the Conservatives, as they followed the national pattern of inflicting heavy losses onto the ruling Labour Party, coming as close to one seat away from seeing Labour lose their 33-strong majority with which they went into the election with. In Mosborough an Independent was elected on a platform of opposition to the takeover of the ward by Sheffield, whilst his counterpart in Birley finished last, but with a respectable 21%.

Overall turnout was a concern in this election, following the downward trend in turnout, resulting in the previous year's record low turnout of 22%. Hopes that this 'mini-election' - as it was dubbed - being the opportunity to decide on the council's control might draw a greater turnout than recent years, were fulfilled as turnout improved dramatically to 33.4%, the highest since 1961.

Election result

The result had the following consequences for the total number of seats on the Council after the elections:

Ward results

By-elections between 1967 and 1968

References

Sheffield City Council election
1967
City Council election, 1967
Sheffield City Council election